In the United Kingdom, the postcode lottery is the unequal provision of services such as healthcare, education and insurance prices depending on the geographic area or postcode. Postcodes can directly affect the services an area can obtain, such as insurance prices. Despite having many non-postal uses, postcodes are only determined based on Royal Mail operations and bear little relation to local government boundaries. More broadly, there is an unequal provision of services around the country, especially in public services, such as access to cancer drugs in the healthcare system or quality of education. These are more likely to be a result of local budgets and decision-making than actual postcodes.

Postcodes were devised solely for the purposes of sorting and directing mail and rarely coincide with political boundaries. However, over time they have become a geographical reference in their own right with postcodes and postcode groups becoming synonymous with certain towns and districts. Further to this, the postcode has been used by organisations for other applications including government statistics, marketing, calculation of car and household insurance premiums and credit referencing.

Changing postcodes 
There are several groups, mostly on the fringes of major population centres, who are affected in one way or another by the associations of their postcode.

Some residents of West Heath in  asked to have their postcodes changed to that of adjacent Bexleyheath, citing higher insurance premiums as reason to change. Some residents of Kingston Vale in  wish to have their postcodes changed to adjacent Kingston upon Thames for the same reasons.

In all these cases Royal Mail has said that there is "virtually no hope" of changing the postcode, referring to their policy of changing postcodes only to match changes in their operations.

Some postcode areas straddle England's borders with Wales and Scotland. This has led to British Sky Broadcasting subscribers receiving the wrong BBC and ITV regions, and newly licensed radio amateurs being given incorrect call signs.

Extended use of postcodes 
The Postal Services Commission says the following regarding the extended use of postcodes and the Postcode Address File (PAF):

See also 

 Unwarranted variation

References

Geodemography
Political geography
Postcodes in the United Kingdom